The College of Education and Legal Studies, Nguru is a state government higher education institution located in Nguru, Yobe State, Nigeria. The current Provost is Abba Idris Adam.

History 
The College of Education and Legal Studies, Nguru was established in 2000. It was formerly known as Atiku Abubakar College of Legal and Islamic Studies Nguru. The College currently offers 20 NCE and 10 Diploma programmes in Sciences, Law, Education, Management Studies, Art and Social Sciences.

Courses 
The institution offers the following courses;

 Islamic Studies
 Hausa
 English
 Economics
 Mathematics
 Integrated Science
 Computer Science
 Social Studies
 Arabic
 Cooperative and Community Development
 Accounts and Audits
 Social Work and Administration
 Peace and Conflict Resolution
 Public Administration
 Business Administration
 Library and Information Science
 Qur’anic Science Education
 Civil Law
 Sharia and Civil Law

References 

Universities and colleges in Nigeria
2000 establishments in Nigeria